Gervase Elwes (–) was an English politician who sat in the House of Commons from 1679 to 1685.

Elwes was the son of Sir Gervase Elwes, 1st Baronet and his wife Amy Trigge, daughter of William Trigge, M.D., of Highworth, Wiltshire. In 1679, he was elected Member of Parliament for Sudbury in the two elections that year. He was commissioner for assessment for  Suffolk and Sudbury from 1679 to 1680. He was elected MP for Sudbury again in 1681. In 1682 he became freeman of Preston. 
 
Elwes died sometime between 13 April 1686 when he was mentioned in a codicil to his father's will and September 1688  when James II's electoral agents reported on Sudbury.

Elwes married  Isabella Hervey, daughter of Sir Thomas Hervey of Ickworth, Suffolk and had two sons and two daughters.

References

1657 births
1687 deaths
English MPs 1679
English MPs 1680–1681
English MPs 1681
Heirs apparent who never acceded